Edward (Leon) Kottick is a retired musicology professor at the University of Iowa in Iowa City.

Biography
Kottick gives the outline facts of his life thus:

"I was born in Jersey City, NJ, in 1930, and was brought up in Brooklyn, NY, where I studied the trombone.  I later became a music major at NYU. Following two years in the army, where I conducted a band, I went to New Orleans, LA, to play in the symphony; but after a few years of that I decided to go to graduate school at Tulane University, where I was introduced to musicology and renaissance music. The combination made a deep impression on me, and after my MA I went to the University of North Carolina for my PhD. (It was there that I saw my first kit harpsichord.) I continued to play the trombone, which helped me support my wife and two daughters, but by this time I had become a dedicated musicologist. After a series of teaching posts around the midwest I ended up at the University of Iowa, where I have happily remained ever since. I ran the collegium musicum at Iowa for many years, and also played recorder in a baroque trio ensemble. I retired from teaching in 1992."

In his years since retiring, Kottick has been active as a scholar and a harpsichord builder. He has also served as an agent for the Zuckermann harpsichord firm.

Harpsichord scholarship
Kottick is the author of three books about the harpsichord.

The Harpsichord Owner's Guide: A Manual for Buyers and Owners (1987) 
Early Keyboard Instruments in European Museums, (1997) coauthored with George Lucktenberg
A History of the Harpsichord (2003)
Kottick's journal publications include work on harpsichord acoustics.

Honors
In 2006 received the Curt Sachs Award from the American Musical Instrument Society, noting his "distinguished work as a scholar, author, lecturer, builder, and designer."

Bibliography
(1967, ed.) The unica in the Chansonnier cordiforme (Paris, Bibliothéque nationale, Rothschild 2973).  American Institute of Musicology.
(1974) Tone and intonation on the recorder.  New York : McGinnis & Marx.
(1977) The collegium: a handbook. Stonington, Conn. : October House, c1977.
(1987) The harpsichord owner's guide : a manual for buyers and owners.  Chapel Hill : University of North Carolina Press.
(1997) Edward Kottick and George Lucktenberg, Early keyboard instruments in European museums.  Bloomington, Ind. : Indiana University Press.
(2003) A history of the harpsichord.  Bloomington, Ind. : Indiana University Press.

For a listing of journal articles see .

External links
Edward Kottick's web site:

Notes

Harpsichord makers
Living people
Year of birth missing (living people)